This is a list of grading systems used by countries of the world, primarily within the fields of secondary education and university education, organized by continent with links to specifics in numerous entries.

Africa

Kenya 
The Kenyan grading system is dependent on the level of institution. The secondary school grading award system ranges from grade A to E with grade thresholds changing each year depending on the intensity of the exam. Institutes and colleges award the results of examinations depending on the KNEC grading system in 4 classes (Distinction, Credit, Pass, Fail) with 7 grades of 1 to 7.  The university grading system awards degrees in terms of class (First Class, Second Class - Upper Division, Second Class - Lower Division and Pass Class). A breakdown of the undergraduate degree grading system for Kenyan universities is:

The grading system for Kenyan colleges is:

The general base grading system used for the grading system in Kenyan secondary schools is:

Nigeria

The choice of grading system at Nigerian schools depends on the institution and sometimes on the faculty of the institution. In addition, grading scales at university-level institutions have changed frequently. Grading scales can be 1 to 8, 1 to 4, or A through G, where A is on a 4.0 scale or on a 5.0 scale. The most common scale is now 1 to 7, with 9 being the highest grade obtained. In addition, degrees are awarded in a Class, depending on the grades received. Degrees may be awarded in the First Class, Second Class (Upper Division), Second Class (Lower Division), Third Class, and Pass Class. Grading scales for secondary certificates are standard. Below is the grading system of Nigerian universities:

South Africa

In South Africa, some universities follow a model based on the British system. Thus, at the University of Cape Town and the University of South Africa (UNISA), the percentages are calibrated as follows: a first-class pass is given for 75% and above, a second (division one) for 70–74%, a second (division two) for 60–69%, and a third for 50–59%. Any lower than 40% is a fail. The University of the Witwatersrand considers an A to be 75% and above.It is important to pass your matriculation test known as the NBT's to get to a college/university.

Tanzania
The provided grades are used within the A-level secondary education system of Tanzania; students may be enrolled within a university or college upon receiving grades from level A to D within 2 of 3 core subjects, with an S grade as a minimum qualification. Three core subjects are generally taken, with additional classes available; grading in universities, however, is an independent process, with grades varying between universities.

Asia
Different countries in Asia have a variety of grading scales. Grading scales for some countries in Asia are described.

Afghanistan

Afghanistan academic Grading System
In Afghanistan, the highest score awarded at schools is 100, the minimum passing score is 40, the highest score in universities is 100 and the minimum passing score is 55 (before 2016 it was 50). The threshold for a good mark depends on the school and the study grade, but on most occasions, 75 or higher is considered a good one.

School Grading System

Universities Grading System

Bangladesh

This article is a summary of academic grading in Bangladesh. Two types of grading systems are available in this country, grade point average (GPA) and cumulative grade point average (CGPA).

High School Grading System

University Grading System

Degree evaluation with ″class″ in university (e.g., First Class, Second Class, Third class, Pass)

The bachelor's and master's degrees result of the public universities in Bangladesh, e.g., University of Dhaka, Jahangirnagar University, Bangladesh Agricultural University, Rajshahi University, University of Chittagong, National University, Gazipur can be classified according to the British undergraduate degree classification system, when it is evaluated with class grade. GPA above or equal to 3 is equal to 1st Class in honors degree in Bangladesh. This means:

CGPA 3.00 to 4.00 = 1st Class
CGPA 2.25 to 2.99 = 2nd Class
CGPA 2.00 to 2.24 = 3rd Class

Grading system in East Delta University

 North South University, East Delta University, BRAC University, American International University-Bangladesh, United International University, East West University and University of Liberal Arts Bangladesh follows North American grading standards, so their grading policy is different from those of typical Bangladeshi universities.

India

Grading in universities
Indian universities follow a Percentage System and Indian Institutes of Technology, National Institutes of Technology, Indian Institutes of Information Technology, Indian Institutes of Engineering Science and Technology and various other centrally funded technical institutes of the country follow a 10-point GPA System. The Percentage System is defined with a maximum grade of 100 marks, a minimum grade of 0 marks and a passing grade from 30 to 40 marks, depending on the university; lower percentages may be considered passing grades at several universities.

The percentage system is as follows:

The 10-point GPA system utilized at the Indian Institutes of Technology, National Institutes of Technology, Indian Institutes of Information Technology, Indian Institutes of Engineering Science and Technology and various other centrally funded technical institutes of the country, however, functions as follows:

An additional university grading system currently utilized in India is the eight-point GPA introduced by University of Mumbai from the 2012–2013 academic year; the system is categorized as follows:

Some universities follow a weighted average pattern to calculate the grade percentage:

The International Grade Conversion system, by World Education Services, for percentages scored in Indian universities allows one to locate the corresponding grade in the US or the corresponding grade point average for each grade provided at an Indian University; the conversion system functions as follows, with the equivalent classification or division provided, as well.

Conversions from divisions to US grades function as follows:

*At selected institutions, a lower grade may be considered passing.

Grading in high school
Most boards in India give the raw marks obtained by the students, though some may only give the grade attained by the student.

National boards like CBSE give the marks obtained by the student and (for CBSE) the positional grade which indicates a student's level in that subject with respect to his/her peers.

Some educational boards still follow the practice of giving 'divisions': a percentage over 90 is considered excellent; between 70–89 is considered to be 'first division'; between 50–69 is considered to be 'second division', between 40–49 is considered to be a pass; though these terminologies and classifications depend on the 'board of education'. CGPA Calculator

Indonesia

Default Grading System/Standar Nasional Pendidikan

Iran

The Iranian grading system is similar to France's and other French-patterned grading systems such as Belgium, Lebanon, Venezuela, and Peru in secondary schools and universities. Since a grading guideline is not provided by the Iranian Ministry of Education, conversion to the international scales is carried out using conversion guideline provided for French-patterned grading systems. In specific cases, grades are converted according to the destination institutes' grading policy. The passing grade is 10 and usually a grade of more than 14 out of 20 is considered excellent. The following table is most commonly used by world institutes and universities to convert from the Iranian grading system:

Israel

In Israel, schools have grades from 1–100, starting from the 4th grade on. In private schools, alphabetic grading system is usually used until secondary education. In universities  both numerical and alphabetical grade systems can be found, according to each university system. The 100-point grading scale is as follows:

The equivalent Letter Grades can be found below:

Japan

In Japan, following the reorganization of national universities in 2004, the Ministry of Education, Sports and Culture has encouraged both public and private universities to adopt a GPA system.

Other higher education institutions give grades on a scale from 0–100 or a few universities apply letter grades. While for years an "A" grade range was from 80 to 100 points, some schools (for example, at Kurume University) have started to give the 90 to 100 point range a special grade to indicate excellence. A failing grade is generally called an "E", though some institutions use "F".

Kazakhstan
According to standardized credit system accepted in the Republic of Kazakhstan, the measurements of varying levels of comprehension in the realm of higher education in the Republic of Kazakhstan are the following:

Kuwait
Kuwait employs a four-point grading system and percentages.

Kyrgyzstan

Kyrgyzstan employs a five-point grading system:

Lebanon
Lebanese schools follow either the French grading system or the American grading system. Most schools use a 0–20 scale where the passing grade is 10 out of 20 (minimum passing grade may be as low as 7). It depends on the programme the school is offering: French/Lebanese Baccalaureate use the 0–20 scale with some exceptions (some schools offer the Lebanese baccalaureate but instead of the 0–20 scale a 100-point scale is used). IB schools unanimously use a 100-point scale if not an American grading scale (refer to the American grading system).

In the typical school offering a Lebanese curriculum (to which the outcome is a Lebanese Baccalaureate) getting high grades is very difficult because teachers do not use the full scale. For instance, the highest score one can earn in essay writing in some schools is 14 out of 20 (with the class averaging 9 or 10). Each subject has a weight and thus contributes differently towards the overall score: the "General Average" (taken from the French Moyenne Générale). This weight is determined by credit hours. For instance, math (6 hours/week) x 20 (the base grade) = 120 (weight).

Example: Sample grades: (Maths 13.33/20, English 13.4/20, Biology 8.25/20)

English: 5 credits × 13.4 = 67 out of possible 100

Math: 6 credits × 13.33 = 79.98 out of possible 120

Biology: 2 credits × 8.25 = 16.5 out of possible 40

Total points earned = 163.48 out of possible 260

General Average / Moyenne Générale  12.575
(Considered a good average, a B+ if not A− US equivalent since the standards are different: Grade 12 in Lebanese Baccalaureate or French Baccalaureate is equivalent to a US College Freshman, moreover all Lebanese programmes include 3 languages and a total of 18 subjects yearly with summer homework.)
Students graduating Lebanese or French Baccalaureate enter universities as sophomores, not freshmen, and can complete their degrees in 3 years.

In some universities, the American grading system is used. Others use the 0–100 scale where the passing grade is 60 or 70 depending on the course. French system universities use the 0–20 grading scale.

Malaysia
Malaysia has its own educational grading system. Different institutions of education use a different grading scheme. This is an example of a grading system practiced in a university in Malaysia.

Until high school, the average percentage is provided. A percentage over 80 is considered excellent; between 60 and 80 is considered to be 'first division'; between 40 and 60 is considered to be 'second division'.

The Percentage System works as follows: the maximum number of marks possible is 100, the minimum is 0, and the minimum number of marks required to pass is 35. Scores of 91–100% are considered excellent, 75–90% considered very good, 55–64% considered good, 45–55% considered fair, 41–44% considered pass, and 0–40% considered fail. A percentage above 65% is referred to as the 1st Division and indicates a high intellectual level. Some universities follow a weighted average pattern to calculate percentage:
1st and 2nd Semester – 40% of the aggregate marks,
3rd and 4th Semester – 60% of the aggregate marks,
5th and 6th Semester – 80% of the aggregate marks,
7th and 8th Semester – 100% of the aggregate marks.

The 10-point GPA is categorized as follows: 

A GPA of over 7 is generally considered to be an indication of a strong grasp of all subjects.

Pakistan

In Pakistan, the grading scheme is as follows:

In the old grading system consisting of "Division Scheme", the range of percentage of marks is as follows:

Nowadays most universities of Engineering and Technology follow the grading system below:

Philippines

Saudi Arabia

Most of the colleges, universities and schools in Saudi Arabia are very similar to the United States except the way the grades are described.

In other universities in Saudi Arabia such as Imam University, King Saud University, King Abdulaziz University, King Khalid University, Princess Nourah bint Abdulrahman University and King Faisal University, the following method is used:

Singapore
Academic grading in Primary school (Grades 1 to 6):

{| class="wikitable"
|-
! Percentage !! Grades
|-
| 91–100 || A
|-
| 75–90 || B
|-
| 60–74 || C
|-
| 50–59 || D
|-
| <50 || F
|}

Academic grading in Secondary school (Grades 7 to 10):

Academic grading in College-Preparatory Junior College (Grades 11 to 12):

The grades for tertiary education are from 0.0 to 4.0 (as inclusive).

South Korea

Middle School (7–9th grade):Points are the student's raw score in midterms and finals (out of 100).

High School (10–12th grade):

The percentage is the students' relative position among other students taking the same subject (100% is the highest, 0% is the lowest).

University:

The following grades are listed as those of universities in South Korea; the system listed is particularly similar to that utilized in the United States.

Thailand
Most undergraduate studies in Thailand use the following 8-point grading system:

For graduate and post-graduate studies, universities sometimes use the following 10-point grading system:

 Turkey 
In Turkey, high school exam grades are from 0 to 100. But final grades are from 1 to 5.

In Undergraduate education, regulations are generally according to the US grade system, depends on the University rules.

 United Arab Emirates 

Primary education is free at government run schools. The grading is managed by the Ministry of Education (MOE). However, there are also many schools run by expatriates that are equally successful with their own grading system, or an accepted grading system of the country where the schools are affiliated to or share common standards with. At most universities and colleges, the United Arab Emirates' grading system is very similar to the United States' system.

 Vietnam 

The grading scale in Vietnam is from 10 to 1 where 10 is the highest, as follows:

Schools and universities in Vietnam use a 10-point grading scale, with 10 being the highest and 0 being the lowest, as follows.

The grading may vary from school to school. It depends on the difficulty of each.

The distribution of grades differs from standards in Western countries and strongly depends on the university. In Vietnamese universities, ten or nine is nearly impossible. Students rarely score higher than 8.0 on their final results.

 Central America 

 Costa Rica 

 Nicaragua 

 Panama 
The grading system in Panama is different from universities than schools.

Universities use 0–100 point grade scaling similar to the United States grading. 71 is required to pass, or roughly the equivalent of a C. Schools use the 1–5 point system, meaning if a student has a 4.5 that is the equivalent of an A− or somewhere around the 95-point range.

When it comes to grade point average (GPA), Panama uses a 0–3 point scale to determine the student's GPA. For instance, if a student has a 2.5 GPA, that is roughly the same as a U.S. student having a 3.0–3.5.

 Europe 

 Albania 

In Albania, grades from 4 to 10 are used, with some schools allowing decimals (up to the hundredth digit) and others only allowing whole numbers.

Most universities evaluate classes with two mid exams and a final. The final exam encompasses the whole course syllabus, whereas the mid exams usually review half. In some schools, if the average grade of the two mid exams is equal to or higher than 7.00, the student is able to pass the class without needing to take a final exam (since there are only two exams, some teachers also pass students who average 6.50; others weigh in the decision based on the student's performance in class). An average of less than 4.00 is failing; students who score such an average are not allowed to take the final exam.

In high schools, the year is divided into three trimesters and classes are usually yearlong. Students need an average of 6.00 or higher in all the three trimesters exams to avoid having to take a final to pass the class. In the event of a student scoring less than 6.00 in the third trimester, he or she would have to take a final exam, regardless of average. This is considered controversial since the last trimestral exam is not more important than the first two, but the rule stands to prevent students who have already reached the minimum average (e.g., two 10.00 in the first two give a student the lowest possible average of 6.33) from not making an effort during the last three months of the year. One's time at a university typically lasts 3–5 years.

 Austria 
In Austria, grades from 1 to 5 are used.

The formalized overall grade in Austria is "pass with distinction" (mit ausgezeichnetem Erfolg bestanden), which is given for excellent performance (average of 1.5 and better, no grade below 3) and "pass" (Bestanden, no grade below 4).

If someone is given a "pass with distinction" in his Matura, Diploma and PhD, all curricula absolved in the regular duration time he can have a 'promotio sub auspiciis presidentis rei publicae', (literally "under the auspices of the President of the Republic", meaning that the Federal President will personally attend the graduation ceremony), which is the highest honor in Austria only achieved by 1 out of 2,500 graduates (.04%) yearly.

Generally speaking, a cumulative Grade Point Average does not exist in the Austrian educational system and therefore has little relevance in the local job market.

 Armenia 
In Armenia, the 10-point grading scale is as follows:
10-9 Գերազանց (Excellent)

7-8.99 լավ (Good)

5-6.99 բավարար (Satisfactory)

<5 անբավարար (Fail)

To convert to percentage (on the 10-point scale), multiply the grade by 10.

 Belgium 
In Belgian universities a scale from 0 to 20 is used on a per-subject basis; a weighted average is then computed on scale from 0 to 20, with 10 being the passing grade per subject. A total average of around 14 (70%) earns a distinction grade (cum laude), around 16 (80%) means high distinction (magna cum laude) and an average of around 18 (90%) yields the highest distinction (summa/maxima cum laude). The exact scores for each grade differ between different universities.

Belgian secondary schools use a scale from 0 to 100 or even above for exams (50 usually being the passing grade). On report cards, certain schools also give grades on a percentage scale (0 to 100) while others use a 0–10 scale. Those total scores are weighted averages of exams and tests. In Belgian secondary schools, there are 6 years. In the first three years, students have to do exams every term. The scores are usually given in percentages. At the end of the school year, a total average score is given.

University colleges (another form of higher education, not comparable with American colleges) use the same scale from 0 to 20 as Belgian universities, although homework and presence may influence sometimes up to 50% or more of these 20 points (situation ). It is more common to have a final exam counting for 100% of the grade if the course does not require laboratory work. Obtaining a grade higher than 16/20 is considered as a very good grade and a 19 or 20/20 is very rare.

Scaling varies significantly depending on the university or college.

 Bosnia and Herzegovina 

In Bosnia and Herzegovina, grades from 5 to 1 are used in primary and secondary education, while grades from 10 to 5 are used at universities.

Primary and secondary education grading:

University grading:

 Bulgaria 
In Bulgaria, the following grade scale is used in schools:

For examinations and tests, exact grading is often used and is represented by two positions after the decimal point:

Grades e.g. Good (3.50), or Excellent (5.75), are common. Every passing grade at or above the .50 mark is prefixed with the term of the higher grade. The minimum is 2.00; grades below 3.00 are failing grades, and the maximum is 6.00. Grades like "Very good" (5-) and "Average" (3+) are also possible – these are ignored in calculations. The (-) or the (+) in the grade are equivalent of either 0.25 marks below or above the set grade, but in most cases they are just for the student to see how far are they from the grade written. The most amounts of (-) in a grade is 2 and the most amounts of (+) is 1, eg. (6--) or (5+). Despite being equivalent of 0.25 marks grade like (3--) is still written down in official documents as 3. The Bad (1.00) is mostly obsolete grade and rarely issued and in some electronic official documents impossible to write down as a grade.

Roughly, the Bulgarian grade system can be equated to the American one like the following: 6=A, 5=B, 4=C, 3=D, and 2=F. Also, in accordance with the Australian system, 6=HD, 5=D, 4=Cr, 3=P, and 2=F.

The most common formula used in Bulgarian schools is currently Grade=(6* number of correct answers)/ total number of questions.
That way if a student has answered 7 out of 10 questions correctly, their mark should be: (6*7)/10=4.20, which is graded as Good 4 or average performance.
Another common formula is Grade = 2 + ((4* number of correct answers)/total answers). That way if a student has answered 7 out of 10 questions correctly, their mark would be: 2 + (4*7)/10 = 4.80, which is graded as Very Good 5.

 Croatia 

In Croatia, the following grade scale is used in schools:

At the end of each semester the grades are averaged to form a Grade Point Average (prosječna ocjena), according to this scale:

In colloquial Croatian, grades are referred to be their numerical values: jedinica, dvojka, trojka, četvorka, petica.
Students with failing grades (1 or F) are allowed to carry those grades throughout the school year, but are required to improve them to passing grades (2 or better) in order to finish the year. Failure to pass one class results in the student being held back a year.

 Czech Republic 
In the Czech Republic, a five-point grading scale is used in both primary and secondary schools:

Plus and minus signs are often used to further differentiate marks. For example, "2+" corresponds to the U.S. 'B+'. Half-intervals may also be used, such as "2–3", a grade halfway between 2 and 3.

At the university level, only grades 1, 2 and 3 are passing; anything worse than 3 is automatically a failing grade. Some universities use a six-point scale, with 'A' corresponding to "1", 'B' to "1–2", etc.

 Denmark 

The current scale, syv-trins-skalaen ("The 7-step-scale"), was introduced in 2007, replacing the old 13-skala ("13-scale"). The new scale is designed to be compatible with the ECTS-scale.Syv-trins-skalaen consists of seven different grades, ranging from 12 to −3, with 12 being the highest. This new scale remains an "absolute" scale, meaning that, proportions are not taken into consideration.

 Estonia 

In universities:

Tallinn University of Technology uses numerical grades from 5 (the highest) to 0 (the lowest) with the same percentages.

 Finland 

Several systems are in use in different educational institutions in Finland. The "school grade" system has historically been a scale of 0 to 10, but all grades lower than 4 have been discarded. Thus, it is now divided between 4, the failing grade, and 5–10, the succeeding grades. Upper secondary school has the same grades for courses and course exams as a comprehensive school but matriculation examination grades are in Latin. Universities and vocational institutions use a scale of 0 (fail) and 1–5 (pass) or fail/pass. Some schools e.g. Savon Ammatti- ja Aikuisopisto, uses grading from 0 (fail) and 1–3 (pass). The professor selects which grading scheme is used; short, optional courses typically have pass/fail grades.

 France 

In France, school grades typically range from either 0 (worst) to 20 (best) or, sometimes, from 0 (worst) to 10 (best). A mark below the average (10 out of 20 or 5 out of 10, depending on the scale) is usually a fail. For the French National High School Level (baccalauréat), a grade of 8–10 typically gives the right to take an additional oral exam in order to try to improve that average to 10 and pass. A grade between 10 and 12 is a simple pass (without grade); between 12 and 14 (more rarely 13–14) the grade is called "assez bien" (rather good); 14–16 is called "bien" (good); above 16 is "très bien" (very good).
For the diplôme national du brevet, awarded after the class of 3ème, the scale ranges from 0 to 800, with 400 being the minimum passing grade, 480 and above being "assez bien", 560 and above being "bien", and 640 and above being "très bien".

Before university, there's usually no minimum required to pass to the next year, and the decision is upon the council of the school, which means an average grade under 10 can be sufficient to pass. This follows a tendency of failing and retrying a year being less and less frequent in France.

In more difficult curricula, such as CPGE or 1st year of medicine, the average grade is usually so low that students pass or fail depending on their rank within the class, and anything above 7 or 8 can be considered a good grade.

World Education Services grade equivalence between France and the U.S.

 Germany 

In Germany, school grades vary from 1 (very good, sehr gut) to 6 (insufficient, ungenügend). In the final classes of German Gymnasium schools that prepare for university studies, a point system is used with 15 points being the best grade and 0 points the worst. The percentage causes the grade can vary from teacher to teacher, from subject to subject and from state to state. The percentages shown in the table are the ones used in the "Oberstufe" (final classes).

* This conversion scheme is intended as a guideline, as exact conversions may differ.

 Greece 

 Scale: 0.00–10.00 (0–100%)
 Pass (module): 5.00 (50%)

The table below depicts the Greek Grading system while illustrates approximately how the Grades are compared with ECTS, US and UK grades:

For the National Technical University of Athens (NTUA) the above grades are different:
9–10 is "excellent", 
7–9 is "very good", 
5–7 is "good", 
0–4.9 is "fail".

 Hungary 
In Hungary, a five-point scale has been used since 1950. There is one failing grade: 1 – elégtelen (insufficient). In general, the lowest passing mark is either 50% or 60%, or one mark (point) higher. Passing grades are 2 – elégséges (sufficient or pass), 3 – közepes (mediocre or satisfactory), 4 – jó (good) and 5 – jeles (very good). The perfect overall performance is named kitűnő or kiváló (excellent).

The bare five-point scale is used almost exclusively for final grades at all educational levels (elementary school, high school, university). During the academic year, however, teachers may use various modifiers, especially in elementary school. A comma after the grade has a minus effect ("alá", below), and an apostrophe (’) after the grade has a plus effect ("fölé", above); a grade halfway between two integers is indicated by the lower and higher one separated by a solidus: 3/4 ("háromnegyed") is equivalent to 3.5, and 4/5 is between 4 and 5, etc. Sometimes "5*", five starred ("csillagos ötös") is used to indicate outstanding performance throughout the semester (only in primary school, as it would be considered childish in secondary school).

 Iceland 

Universities in Iceland categorize their grades as follows

In both elementary and high schools, grades were recently changed from 0–10 into the following:

 Ireland 
The two government regulated educational qualifications are the Junior Certificate (usually taken at 15/16) and the Leaving Certificate (usually taken at between the ages of 17 and 19).

Passing or failing the Junior Cert (or any exams in Irish secondary schools), has no bearing on whether or not students can graduate or continue on.

For the Leaving Certificate, a points system is used. Previously, this consisted of lettered and numbered grades (A1, A2, B1, B2), with each grade separated by 5%, bar an A1 which was given for a mark over 90%. However, this was updated for the 2016/2017 Leaving Cert cycle and these letters were replaced by H (higher level), O (ordinary level) and F (foundation level). Each grade is separated by 10%. A maximum of 6 subjects are counted, with a possible 100 points in each subject. For students sitting the higher level maths paper, an extra 25 points can be obtained by getting a grade above a H6. In practice, most students take 7 or 8 subjects and their best 6 results are counted. Each subject has 2 or 3 levels: higher, ordinary and foundation. The points are:

The points system allocates all university places in Ireland for Irish applicants.

Irish universities vary in their grading systems. For example, UCD (University College Dublin) awards letter grades and corresponding GPA values similar to the United States system, but 1, 2.1, 2.2 etc. for degrees, while TCD (Trinity College Dublin) awards all grades as 1, 2.1, 2.2 etc.

 Italy 
In Italy, primary and secondary school grades may vary from 10 (excellent) to 1 (impossible to assess), with passing being 6.

Note: 0 is used very rarely.

When a professor wants to apply a more precise scale and ranking for students assessments, instead of using the full 1–10 scale (which would make the scale inconsistent with that of other professors), s/he may sometimes have recourse to a plethora of symbols and decimals: the range between 5 and 6 is then expressed, in ascending order, by 5+, 5½, and 6− (or 5/6, named "5 to 6"). The minimum passing is 6. As these symbols (except ½) have no clear mathematical value (usually ±0.25), calculating end-year averages can be somewhat arbitrary and inconsistent; therefore, there has been a push since 2008 with the Gelmini reform to uniform the system to the 1–10 scale.

Before this reform, primary and secondary school grades used a different grading scale that expressed an assessment of the pupil's progress:

 Ottimo ("Excellent")
 Distinto ("Very Good")
 Buono (Good)
 Sufficiente (Pass)
 Insufficiente (Fail)

A recent school reform provides for the average grade of a student to include the grade for behavior; as in academic subjects, acceptable ratings range from 6 to 10.

In universities, a point system is used for exams, with 30 points being the best grade and 18 the minimum passing grade. This stems from the practice that exams were traditionally given by 3 examiners. Each had to rate the student's examination performance on a 1–10 scale, and the final grade was the sum of the three ratings. On a 1–10 scale, passing is 6, so on a 1–30 scale the minimum passing grade is 3*6 = 18. Nowadays the form of each examination is decided by the professor (number of examiners, whether written, oral, or both, etc.), but the traditional grading system remained.

Degrees have an analogous point system, in which however the highest grade is 110. A cum laude notation (e lode in Italian) is used to augment the highest grade for both exams and degrees, in all its levels, to reflect truly outstanding performance.

 Summary 
 Primary and secondary school
 10-point grading scale; highest result 10, pass result 6
 Licenza media (commonly known as "Terza media")
 10-point grading scale; highest result 10 e lode, pass result 6
 Maturità
 100-point grading scale; highest result 100 e lode, pass result 60
 University
 Exams: 30-point grading scale; highest result 30 e lode, pass result 18 
 Laurea (bachelor's degree) and laurea magistrale (master's degree): 110-point grading scale; highest result 110 e lode, pass result 66

 Kosovo 
In Kosovo, grading is as follows:

 Latvia 
The academic grading system in Latvia is using ten-point scale, where "10" is the highest achievable grade, and "1" is awarded for extremely poor performance. The minimal passing grade is "4". In most universities,  to get the "4", you must acquire at least 50% correct on the work you hand in. Though some universities have a minimum passing grade of "5".

The absence of any kind of performance is indicated by "nv" ( 'no assessment possible'); in the past, The mark for absence of work was "0". Teachers in lower classes and for minor assignments in higher classes are encouraged to award one of two grades: "i" ( 'counted') for a passing grade, and "ni" ( 'not counted') for a failing grade. The grade of 10 is reserved for exceptional achievements. 9 is most commonly used for a United States equivalent of an A. In some cases, the grade can be rounded for example if a student got 67% the grade can sometimes be rounded to a 7.

 Lithuania 
In Lithuania, the grading system was changed to a 10-point scale in 1993. Prior to that, Soviet Lithuania had a 5-point grading scale. 10 is the highest achievable grade for excellent performance and 1 is the lowest. Usually, 1 is given when there is no work submitted at all (called kuolas  in the academic jargon, meaning 'stake'); otherwise, most teachers keep 2 as the lowest grade and rarely mark work as 1.

The lowest grade for passing a subject in the secondary education institutions is 4, while in the higher education institutions 5 is the lowest passing grade.

Notes:
 *No answer provided, failed to complete the task.

 Moldova 
Moldova uses a 10-point scale system, 5 being the minimum grade for passing:

 Netherlands 

In the Netherlands, grades from 1.0 up to 10.0 are used, with 1 being worst and 10 being best. One's score is determined by dividing the number of points acquired by the total amount. Then it is multiplied by 9 and one point is added. So if one scores a 58/64 on a test their score is calculated as following: 58 / 64 * 9 + 1 = 9.2. Sometimes points are deducted for the number of faults on a test (typically, on vocabulary or topographical tests with more than 10 questions, each fault will nonetheless lead to a reduction in score of one. So 2 faults on a 50 question vocabulary test would constitute an 8). The grades 9 and 10 are hardly ever given on large examinations (on average, a 9 is awarded in only 1.5%, and a 10 in 0.5% of the cases). Generally, either one or two decimal places are predominantly used in secondary and higher education. In primary education, fractions of grades are identified with a + or −, which signifies a quarter (converted to either 0.8 or 0.3 if only one decimal place is used). Thus, a grade of 6.75 (or 6.8) could be written as 7−, whereas a grade of 7+ would count for 7.25 or 7.3.

A 5.5 constitutes a pass, whereas 5.4 and below constitute a fail. If no decimal places are used, 6 and up is a pass and 5 and below is a fail; however, in this case of grading in full numbers there exists sometimes "6-", which would officially translate to 5.75, but can be interpreted here as "barely, but just good enough". If the grade would be a 5.49 and one decimal is used, the 5.49 will be a 5.5, but if no decimals are used (usually at the end of the year) the 5.49 will end up as a 5 which indicates a fail.

Depending on the specific university, some students who finish their studies with an average of 8.0 or higher, could get the nomination cum laude (which is comparable with summa cum laude as awarded in Germany and the United States).

The grade scale with its labels:

 North Macedonia 
Primary and secondary education:

University grading:

 Norway 

In primary school (Barneskole, from age 6 to 13) no official grades are given. However, the teachers write an individual comment or analysis on tests and at the end of every term.

Lower secondary school (Ungdomsskole; age 13–16) and upper secondary school (Videregående skole; age 16–19) use a scale running from 1 through 6, with 6 being the highest and 2 the lowest passing grade. It is not possible to fail a grade in Lower Secondary School, even 1 is a passing grade. For non-final tests and mid-term evaluations the grades are often post fixed with + or − (except 6+ and 1−). It is also common to use grades such as 5/6 or 4/3 indicating borderline grades. However, the grades students get on their diploma (Vitnemål), are single-digit grades 1, 2, 3, 4, 5 or 6. The student's non-weighted grade point average is also given on the Vitnemål.

In higher education, according to the ECTS-system, grades for undergraduate and postgraduate examinations are awarded according to a graded scale from A (highest) to F (lowest), with E as the minimum passing grade. The ECTS system was implemented at Norway's universities and colleges in the early 2000s, with most schools having converted to ECTS by 2003.

Before 2003, the formerly most common system of grades used at the university level was based on a scale running from 1.0 (highest) through 6.0 (lowest), with 4.0 being the lowest passing grade. The way the new Bologna system was introduced implies that students, who had started their studies while the old system still was in effect, will graduate with transcripts containing grades from both systems (i.e. both numbers and letters).

An academic year has two semesters, from August to December and from January to June, although exceptions occur. Courses are measured in "studiepoeng" according to the ECTS standard (European Credit Transfer System credits). A normal full-time study progression awards 60 credits (studiepoeng/stp) per year (30 per semester). Most institutions either use a 7.5, 8, 10, 12, 15 or 20 credit block system.

 Poland 
The most commonly used system in Polish grade schools is as follows (with usual corresponding score percentages):

The grade 'excellent' as a final grade is usually awarded for extracurricular merit. In examinations, it is sometimes awarded for a perfect or near-perfect score (100%+, for example by answering extra-credit questions).

Grades (especially expressed numerically) can be suffixed with + (plus) or – (minus). On rare occasions, the = (double minus, 'rails') is used, especially as 2= also called "dwa na szynach" (literally: two on rails) to express the very lowest passing grade.

Before 1990, grades 1 and 6 were not used. It was grade 2 that was called "insufficient". 3=>, also called trzy na szynach (literally: three on rails) was the very lowest passing grade. The grade 6 might have been issued on very rare occasions.

Post-secondary institutions use a different system, usually consisting of the following grades (with usual corresponding score percentages):

The scores corresponding to each grade vary greatly from institution to institution and from course to course, but usually, a score of 50% or 51% is required to obtain the lowest passing grade (3.0). The notations zal. (zaliczony – passed) and nzal. (niezaliczony – not passed) are used when the course only requires attendance and/or is not important (such as sports).

 Portugal 

In Portuguese primary and middle schools, up until the 9th grade inclusive, the grading system is as follows:

From the 10th grade onwards, including tertiary education, a 20-point grading scale is used, with 10 passing grades and 10 failing grades, with 20 being the highest grade possible and 9.5, rounded upwards to 10, the minimum grade for passing. This 20-point system is used both for test scores and grades.

 Romania 
The system used in Romanian primary schools is as follows:

In secondary schools, high schools, and academic institutions, a 10-point scale is used, 5 being the minimum grade for passing:

There is no 0. If a student scores 86%, he will be given a grade of 8.60, which will be rounded to a 9. Further, for a score of 94%, a grade of 9.40 is given that is rounded down to 9. The average of grades are not rounded, thus a student can earn an average grade of e.g. 9.55.

 Russia 

Most Russian educational institutions use a five-point grading scale:

Qualifiers + and − are often used to add some degree of differentiation between the grades: e.g., 4+ is better than 4, but not quite as good as 5−. Grading varies greatly from school to school, university to university, and even teacher to teacher, even for courses that lend themselves to objective markings, such as mathematics and applied sciences. Even though the grades technically range from 1 to 5, 1 is not common and is rarely given for academic reasons—in many cases, a 1 is given as a result of failure to show up for or to complete an exam. A 2 grade usually means that the student showed no or little knowledge in a subject.

It may be worth mentioning that 1 is a fairly exotic grade in Russian schools, but it does officially exist. The generally used grades are 2 to 5. Plus (+) and minus (−) modifiers follow the same tendency; they are rarely used in middle school and almost never in colleges or universities. Some institutions and teachers, dissatisfied with the five-point scale, work with various larger ones, but these grading systems are not recognized by the state and require conversion for official use.

A considerably more complex grading system has been implemented for the recently introduced Unified state examinations. In this system, a "primary grade" is the sum of points for completed tasks, with each of the tasks having a maximum number of points allocated to it. The maximum total primary grade varies by subject so that one might obtain a primary grade of 23 out of 37 in mathematics and a primary grade of 43 out of 80 in French. The primary grades are then converted into final or "test grades" by means of a sophisticated statistical calculation, which takes into account the distribution of primary grades among the examinees. This system has been criticized for its lack of transparency.

At universities some subjects are graded "Pass/No pass"  or "Credit/No Credit" (зачёт/незачёт, pronounced "zachòt/nyezachòt"); the rest are typically graded on the five-point scale. The "Pass/No Pass" grades do not have any official numeric representation. When zachòt – (credit- or pass-) type subjects are graded as "Pass/No pass", this represents a student's knowledge of a subject. Each university applies its own standards with respect to the knowledge a student must have in order to pass a subject. Zachòt equival to pass with mark of minimum 77% to maximum 100%. Students in Russia must pass all prescribed courses in order to graduate.

Since the word zachòt can be translated variously into English (e.g. as "credit" or "pass"), this notation can create problems for Russian students applying to Western universities. Such grades may confuse Western universities and complicate the accurate calculation of students' GPAs in Western systems. For Western system "Pass" calculation recommended to perform based on averages. Western universities and equivalency organizations usually disregard zachòt, despite the fact that this notation is typically used for about half of a student's course results. Consequently, most Western GPA conversions of Russian degrees reflect only part of a candidate's coursework.

All course examinations and zachot tests must be passed at the time each is given, as there are no repeats, resits or grade appeals. Hence only those who satisfy all the requirements during the allotted examination period for each semester graduate, leaving a huge number of students behind who in the West would have had a chance to resit examinations and even get their grades reconsidered. Furthermore, grades in Russia are determined not only by examination results but also by other criteria such as class attendance and participation, term papers and projects, in-class and homework assignments, laboratory reports, presentations, and sometimes even grooming and behavior. All these must be passed during the semester before a 'final examination mark' and final zachot is awarded.

Russian degrees do not have composite classifications such as in the British system of First Class, Upper/Lower Second Class, Third Class, Pass, etc. This is because each course is examined independently, students must pass all of them, and they do not add up or contribute to an average grade or 'class'. Another reason is that during the Russian Revolution, social stratification and classification were supposedly abolished in the interest of promoting social equality. Accordingly, all students would be expected to perform at or above the minimum level required to qualify and graduate. Calculation of an aggregate mark or GPA is not considered fair or even possible, as it would be felt to disregard much of a candidate's academic work. The zachòt notation would complicate such calculation, and the final thesis qualifying mark is usually considered as the final result. Students who have shown exceptional academic talent by getting 5s in most of their courses are awarded a 'degree with excellence', which comes in a special red cover.

Serbia 

Serbia has the same academic grading system of the Former Yugoslavia. In elementary schools and secondary schools, a five-point grading scale is used:

At the university the grade scale used is as follows:

Slovakia 
In Slovakia, a five-point grading scale is used in primary and secondary schools:

Slovenia 

In elementary schools and secondary schools, a 5-point grading scale is used:

 5 (odlično, excellent, A)
 4 (prav dobro, very good, B)
 3 (dobro, good, C)
 2 (zadostno, sufficient, D) is the lowest passing grade.
 1 (nezadostno, insufficient, F) is the lowest possible grade, and the failing one.

At the university level is used a 10-point scale grading system:

Spain 

In Spain, schools grades typically range either 0 (worst) to 10 (best). A mark below 5 is usually a fail. These grades are described as follows:

Sweden 

Since the autumn of 2012, grades in Sweden have been given to students in the 6th grade and above. Previously, grades were given from the 8th grade for many years. Students below the 6th grade receive an estimation of their knowledge in each subject from their teachers. The current Swedish national grade scale has been used since 2011 and contains six grades which translate to a number of points, as shown below.

The grades A to E are passing grades, while F denotes failure. Grades A, C and E all have different requirements and the requirements for A are, naturally, the hardest to reach. The grades B and D are given when a student has met all the requirements for the grade below (E or C) and a majority of the requirements for the grade above (C or A).
When a student reaches the end of the Swedish nine-year-school and Upper Secondary School, their 17 best grades and points are turned into a qualification value (max 340 points) which they use to apply for their next level of education.

Switzerland 
Switzerland has a grading scheme from 1 to 6, where 6 is the highest, 1 the lowest, and 4 the minimum pass mark; anything below 4 designates insufficient performance. It is used on all levels of education, such as primary schools, lower and higher secondary schools, universities, and vocational education.

Except this general pattern, the meaning and the calculation of the grades is subject to the respective cantonal office of education. The cantonal office of educations usually follow the following pattern:

A final mark can be any of the discrete number between 1 and 6, or anything between two of them usually rounded up or down to the next half or quarter value (.25, .5, .75), or to one or two digits behind the decimal point.

An oversimplified way to calculate a grade is: (acquired points/total points ) × 5 + 1 = grade.

Ukraine 

Current grading system was introduced in Ukraine in autumn 2000, which replaced the Soviet grading system.

12 is the equivalent of an honors/AP course "A+" in the U.S. and is usually given only for outstanding achievement or exceptionally creative work. Hence 11 is the grade that would ordinarily correspond to A in the United States.

United Kingdom

England and Wales 
GCSE exams are graded as follows. Grade marks fluctuate based on national results.

A-Level
A-Level exams are graded as follows. Grade marks fluctuate based on national results.

Grading in universities

A degree may be awarded with or without honours, with the class of an honours degree usually based on a weighted average mark of the assessed work a candidate has completed. The degree classifications are:
 First class honours (1st)
 Second class honours, upper division (2:1)
 Second class honours, lower division (2:2)
 Third class honours (3rd)
 Ordinary degree (pass)

Scotland 
Despite grade marks fluctuating based on national results, the Scottish Qualifications Authority grading scheme goes as follows for National 5, Higher and Advanced Higher:

For National 3 and 4 courses in Scotland, the only grades are as follows:

European academic grading 
With the exception of Liechtenstein, which uses the Swiss grading system, and Moldova, which uses the Romanian grading system, the majority of European countries create their own academic grading standards. Most involve combinations of the key elements of grading, and all are used to evaluate students' performance on a scale of passing to failing (or comprehending to not comprehending material).

Austria, Belgium, Bosnia and Herzegovina, Bulgaria, Croatia, Czech Republic, Finland, France, Germany, Greece, Hungary, Italy, Latvia, Lithuania, Luxembourg, Norway, Poland, Portugal, Romania, Serbia, Slovakia, Slovenia, Spain, Sweden, Switzerland, Ukraine, United Kingdom

North America

Canada 

Conversions by province from percentage marks to letter grades and correspondent grade points are as follows:

Alberta 

In Alberta's post-secondary colleges, technical institutes, or universities, the actual percentage associated with letter grade is up to the individual institution or professor teaching the course.

The 4.33 is scored as a 4.00 at the University of Alberta, Southern Alberta Institute of Technology, MacEwan University, and the University of Calgary.

There is no universal percentage grade associated with any letter grade in the Province of Alberta and such associations are made by professors or a bell curve. A student may be awarded an Honours designation on parchment if semester and cumulative grade point average of 3.7 is achieved on the first attempt of courses required towards graduation of major. In addition, students will need to complete graduation requirements within specific time restrictions. D is the minimum general passing letter grade to receive credit for a course. Certain faculties may require higher grades to receive course credit.

Some universities in Alberta have used a nine-point stanine grading scale: 9=A+, 8=A/A–, 7=B+/B, 6=B–/C+, 5=C, 4=D, 0 to 3=F.

British Columbia 
The following table is only an approximation; faculties within universities sometimes follow a different system for converting percentage marks to letter grades.

The University of British Columbia uses a percentage grading scale.

Simon Fraser University uses a 4.33-point grading scale.

Secondary schools in the School District 38 of Richmond use another grading scale.

In some faculties, such as the School of Engineering Sciences program at its Faculty of Applied Sciences, a course grade score of a D is considered a fail if it is a prerequisite course.

The University of Victoria uses a 9-point grading scale alongside a percentage-based system.

Manitoba 
The University of Manitoba uses a 4.5-point scale GPA system.

GPA is Calculated taking total "points" and divided by school credit hours.

Newfoundland and Labrador 
In Newfoundland and Labrador at Memorial University:

Grade F is the sole failing mark.

Nova Scotia 
In most Nova Scotia universities:

Grade F is the sole failing mark.

Ontario 
Percentage and grade equivalence

The University of Ottawa uses a grade point average system with numbers ranging from 0 to 10 despite many schools using the 12 point system.

Official grading system at the University of Ottawa: Letter grade, numerical value, and percentage equivalency

Quebec, New Brunswick 
In Quebec and New Brunswick universities:

This scale is used by at least UQTR. The Université de Montréal scale is similar but goes from A+ to F. Université Laval uses a similar 4.33 scale. UQAM,  Concordia University and Université de Sherbrooke uses a 4.3 scale. This scale is much alike many other scales used in Canada.

McGill University and the École Polytechnique de Montréal use a 4.0 scale. Université de Sherbrooke scale is from A+ to E.

The percent equivalent of each grade and the passing mark can vary. The passing mark in high school and college is 60%.

Saskatchewan 
The University of Saskatchewan and University of Regina both use a percentage grade system, universal across faculties and departments.

Mexico 

Mexican schools use a scale from 0 to 10 to measure students' scores. Since decimal scores are common, a scale from 0 to 100 is often used to remove the decimal point.

In some universities, students who fail a subject have the option of taking an extraordinary test (examen extraordinario, often shortened to extra) that evaluates the contents of the entire period. Once the test is finished and the score is assessed, this score becomes the entire subject's score, thus giving failing students a chance to pass their subjects. Those who fail the extraordinary test have two more chances to take it; if the last test is failed, the subject is marked as failed and pending, and depending on the school, the student may fail the entire year.

Some private schools (particularly in higher levels of education) require a 70 to pass instead of the regular 60.

Grades are often absolute and not class-specific. It may be the case that the top of the class gets a final grade of 79. Curve-adjustment is rare. Grad-level students are usually expected to have grades of 80 or above to graduate. Students in the honor roll are usually those with an overall GPA of 90 or higher upon graduation, and some private universities will award them a "With Honors" diploma. Additionally, in some private universities, the pass scores are higher or lower depending from the kind of studies that are related with (for example, in some universities, in the case of Engineering, the minimum score is 7.3 and for Art, Sciences is 8.8) and lower than this score is not acceptable.

United States 

The most popular and commonly used grading system in the United States uses discrete evaluation in the form of letter grades. Many schools use a GPA (grade-point average) system in combination with letter grades. There are also many other systems in place. Some schools use a scale of 100 instead of letter grades. Others, including many Montessori schools, eschew discrete evaluation in favor of pure discursive evaluation. There is no standardized system of grading in the United States. As such, those issues are left up to individual universities, schools and the regulatory authority of the individual states.

At most schools, colleges and universities in the United States, letter grades follow a five-point system, using the letters A, B, C, D and E/F, with A indicating excellent, C indicating average and F indicating failing. Additionally, most schools calculate a student's grade point average (GPA) by assigning each letter grade a number and averaging those numerical values. Generally, American schools equate an A with a numerical value of 4.0. Most graduate schools require a 3.0 (B) average to take a degree, with C or C− being the lowest grade for course credit. Most undergraduate schools require a 2.0, or C average to obtain a degree with a minimum of D or D− to pass a course. For most secondary schools, the minimum overall and course passes are both D or D−. Some districts, such as Mount Olive Township School District in New Jersey, have eliminated D as a passing grade for their students due to a high failure rate.

Whereas most American graduate schools use four-point grading (A, B, C, and E/F), several—mostly in the west, especially in California—do award D grades but still require a B average for a degree qualification. Some American graduate schools use nine- or ten-point grading scales, formerly including the Rackham School of Graduate Studies at the University of Michigan, where 9.0 = A+, 8.0 = A, 7.0 = A−, and so on. (Rackham switched to a more conventional four-point scale in August 2013.)

In a handful of states, GPA scales can go above 4.0.

The percentage needed in any given course to achieve a certain grade and the assignment of GPA point values varies from school to school, and sometimes between instructors within a given school. The most common grading scales for normal courses and honors/Advanced Placement courses are as follows:

Some states may use an alternate grading scale such as the following which is commonly used.

Whether a school uses E or F to indicate a failing grade typically depends on time and geography. Around the time of World War II, several states began to use E, while the majority of the country continued to use the F, which traces to the days of Pass/Fail grading (P and F). In recent years, some schools have begun using an N for failing grades, presumably to represent "No Credit". Another letter used to represent a failing grade is U, representing "unsatisfactory."

Chromatic variants ("+" and " − ") are used. In most 100-point grading systems, the letter grade without variants is centered around a value ending in five. The "plus" variant is then assigned the values near the nine digit and the "minus" variant is assigned the values near zero. Any decimal values are usually rounded. Thus, a score of 80 to 82 is a B−, a score 83 to 86 is a B and a score of 87 to 89 is a B+. The four-point GPA scale, the letter grade without variants is assigned to the integer. The "plus" and "minus" variants are then assigned to .3 above the integer and .3 below the integer, respectively. Thus, a B is equal to 3.0, a B+ is equal to 3.3, and a B− is equal to 2.7.

The A range is often treated as a special case. In most American schools, a 4.00 is regarded as perfect and the highest GPA one can achieve. Thus, an A, being the prime grade, achieves the mark of a 4.00; for the A+ mark, most schools still assign a value of 4.00, equivalent to the A mark, to prevent deviation from the standard 4.00 GPA system. However, the A+ mark, then, becomes a mark of distinction that has no impact on the student's GPA. A few schools, however, do assign grade values of 4.33 or 4.30; but the scale is still called "4.0", because grading scales (or "quality indices") take their numerical names from the highest whole number.

In many American high schools, students may also score above 4.0 if taking advanced, honors, Advanced Placement, or International Baccalaureate classes (for example, a "regular" A would be worth four points, but an A earned in an advanced class might be worth 4.5 or 5 points towards the GPA.). This is called a weighted GPA.

There has been dispute over how colleges should look at grades from previous schools and high schools because one grade in one part of the country might not be the equivalent of a grade in another part of the country. In other words, an "A" might be 90–100 somewhere, and a 94–100 somewhere else. In middle and high schools that do not use a system based on academic credit, the grade point average is computed by taking the mean of all grades. In colleges and universities that use discrete evaluation, the grade-point average is calculated by multiplying the quantitative values by the credit value of the correlative course and then dividing the total by the sum of all credits.

For example:

 Total Credits: 11
 Total Grade Points: 35.3
 Grade Point Average: 35.3 / 11 = 3.209 or slightly below B+

In a standards-based grading system, a performance standard is set by a committee based on ranking anchor papers and grading rubrics, which demonstrate performance which is below, meeting, or exceeding the "standard.". This standard is intended to be a high, world-class level of performance, which must be met by every student regardless of ability or class, although they are actually set by a committee with no reference to any other national standard Levels are generally assigned numbers between zero and four. Writing papers may be graded separately on content (discussion) and conventions (spelling and grammar). Since grading is not based on a curve distribution, it is entirely possible to achieve a grading distribution in which all students pass and meet the standard. While such grading is generally used only for assessments, they have been proposed for alignment with classroom grading. However, in practice, grading can be much more severe than traditional letter grades. Even after ten years, some states, such as Washington, continue to evaluate over half of their students as "below standard" on the state mathematics assessment.

Here is another example of a commonly used grading scale, currently in place at Wayzata High School in Plymouth, Minnesota. The Grade Point Average is not the traditional four-point scale, but uses the 12-point scale for unweighted classes and the 15-point scale for weighted classes:

The 12-point GPA scale works as follows. Students receive 12 points for an A or A+, 11 points for an A−, 10 points for a B+, etc. for each grading period. Once a grading period is complete, the student's total grade points are divided by the total number of credits and a GPA is generated.

For example, here is one term of grades and a grade point average from a student whose school uses the 86-minute block schedule (such as Wayzata High School):

Standards-based grading
Standards-based grading is a well-known practice of assessment. It provides students with learning expectations and an in depth way of evaluation students. It is not the most common assessment method but it provides students with developmental feedback. Researchers have determined that students who were previously exposed to standards-based grading reflected higher performance.

Alternative grading methods
Alternative grading methods offer a diverse way of assessing student progress. Recent studies reveal that alternative grading methods may lead to more applicable growth opportunities for students over time. These methods can include portfolios, narrative evaluations, contract grading, developmental meetings and verbal feedback. These methods provide insight to evaluation methods and emphasize student progress and improvement. Some alternative grading methods include contract grading, the Waldorf assessment style, and narrative evaluation.

Contract grading emphasizes learning behaviors. Most students are accepting of contract grading; however, the data shows that less than half of students noted they found it helpful and less stressful than letter grades. Most students that dislike this method were advanced students and found the process to be repetitive.

The Waldorf assessment style consists of developmental meetings and an evaluation letter. Waldorf grading methods focused more on what they were learning rather than how well each student applied it. It emphasizes positive feedback and progress. Some people may label it as unstructured, others may describe it as a personalized and relaxed style of learning and assessment.  Waldorf philosophy strongly reiterates the growth and improvement of the students.

Narrative evaluation can be defined as detailed written feedback. Studies show that over half of students really like narrative evaluation. It focuses on improvement and provides personal detail of how students have grown. It allows for more personalized feedback and eliminates the competitive nature of students to compare themselves to their classmates.

Oceania

Australia

Both NAPLAN and final year secondary school gradings are specified in "Bands", approximately as follows:

During the final year of high school, Extension subjects, such as Mathematics (Extension 1) and Mathematics (Extension 2), are marked out of fifty, rather than the normal 100 marks, and thus, have slightly different criteria:

The majority of Australian tertiary institutions use the following grading structure:

Some other Australian universities have a marking system similar to the Honours system used by British universities:

Many courses also have Non-Graded Pass (NGP) and Non-Graded Fail (NGF), in which it is considered more appropriate to have qualitative than quantitative assessment. However, in some universities, an F1 category may be given a 'Pass Conceded' if the student's Weighted Average is greater than a nominated threshold. (More often than not, this is around the 53–55 range.)

Grade-point averages are not generally used in Australia below a tertiary level but are important for selection into graduate entry courses such as Medicine and Law. They are calculated according to the more complicated formula than some other nations, and may be customized for the particular course application when used as entry criteria into graduate entry degrees:

Grade Point Average (GPA) = Sum of (grade points × course unit values) / total number of credit points attempted, in which grade points are as follows:

 High Distinction = 7
 Distinction = 6
 Credit = 5
 Pass = 4
 Fail level 1 = 1
 Fail level 2 = 0

At some universities, among them Macquarie University, University of Technology, Sydney, Royal Melbourne Institute of Technology (RMIT) and Monash University in Melbourne, a GPA is calculated, with 4.0 being a High Distinction; 3.0 a Distinction, 2.0 a Credit, and 1.0 a pass. In certain faculties, such as law, it is, therefore, possible to graduate with "honours" with a GPA of less than 2.5. Whenever a course result is a Non-Graded Pass, the result will normally be disregarded in GPA calculations.

The term course unit values is used to distinguish between courses that have different weightings e.g. between a full year course and a single semester course.

The grading of secondary school graduates varies from state to state, but in most states, the ATAR (Australian Tertiary Admissions Rank) system determines which students are offered positions in tertiary courses. Government Supported Positions are offered to applicants for a course who are ranked above a particular ATAR threshold, which commonly varies from course to course, institution to institution, and year to year. (An example of this is an ATAR of 85 for Civil Engineering at the University of New South Wales.) A student's ATAR signifies that student's rank relative to their year 7 cohort, including students that did not complete year 12. A student with an ATAR of 80.00, for example, has performed, in their final year of secondary schooling, better than 80 percent of that student's year 7 cohort, had all those years 7 students completed year 12 and been eligible for an ATAR.

On the other hand, graduating Year 12 students in Queensland are given an Overall Position (OP) from 1 to 25, with 1 being the highest band. OPs are calculated from a student's grades in their year 12 (and in some cases, year 11) courses, and also from Student Achievement Indicators (SAIs) which are allocated by the student's teachers.

New Zealand

Most New Zealand secondary schools use the National Certificate of Educational Achievement (NCEA) marking schedule, even in pre-NCEA years for commonality. There are four grades, from lowest to highest, Not Achieved (N/A or N), Achieved (A), Achieved with Merit (M), and Achieved with Excellence (E). These can also be marked at certain levels for junior exams and general assignments as well as exams once the student has started NCEA. The grading for these specific marks are as follows, Not Achieved minus (N/A1 or N1), Not Achieved plus (N/A2 or N1), Achieved (A3), Achieved plus (A4), Merit (M5), Merit plus (M6), Excellence (E7) and Excellence plus (E8). It is possible to get an achieved, merit or excellence minus, but would be marked as the first number used for the grade. The difference between an achieved plus and merit minus is simply if the student has applied all of the achieved requirements but not enough merit requirements or has applied all of the achieved requirements and just enough merit requirements to reach merit. However, these grades are often check marked if that is the case and regardless of whether the student got a merit minus or straight merit, they will be rewarded with merit level credits for the assessment. The minority of schools using other secondary school qualifications (usually CIE or IB) have different grades. Grading at tertiary institutions generally centers around a letter scale, with a corresponding nine-point GPA scale (C−=1, A+=9).

South America

Argentina
In Argentina, the GPA is calculated quarterly, each semester, or annually. Grades usually range from 1 to 10. The passing mark is typically 70% or around two thirds, which in secondary school is represented by a grade of 7.

Depending on the university, admittance may require:

 Completion of secondary school.
 A common basic year to all degrees or an entrance exam for some of the more popular degree programs.

University grades are also on a scale of 1 to 10, but a passing mark is represented by 4, which usually corresponds to a mark of 70–75%, or higher.

Brazil
In Brazil, the GPA – known as Coeficiente de Rendimento, or Índice de Rendimento Acadêmico – is calculated per semester or per year or both. The High School GPA is almost never used for college entrance evaluation in public universities (state funded and free of charge). To enter state colleges, Brazilian students must attend to entrance exams called vestibulares. The most famous ones are FUVEST, the entrance exam for University of São Paulo, and ENEM, a national exam that ranks high school students to be accepted by federal funded colleges. The private college system also apply entrance exams, but some might use the GPA as an evaluation method.
During college, the GPA is calculated as a weighted average of grade and course hours and has a bigger importance than in high school as it determines the priority in receiving scholarships, for example.

The majority of schools adopt a 0.00 (worst) to 10.00 (best) scale for grading, and some of the Brazilian schools adopt the following grading system:

A grade below 6.0 (60%) is a fail, although some schools have passing criteria of 7.0 (70%).

Chile
Grades are assigned with a numeric scale from 1.0 to 7.0, including at least one decimal, with 4.0 as the lowest passing grade (equivalent to either 50%, 60% or even 70%, depending on the teacher). Everything under a 4.0 is considered a "red mark," which equates to failing. For the PSU, Prueba de Selección Universitaria (UST, University Selection Test), the scale goes from 150 to 850 points. The points follow a normal distribution, being 500 the average result. Depending on the university and the major, the student will need a minimum score to get accepted. The final score will depend on the points obtained in each test: Mathematics and Linguistics (both mandatory); Natural Sciences and History (only one of them mandatory) and the NEM score, Notas de Enseñanza Media (High School Grades which is the same as GPA) converted into the PSU Scale.

Numerical system from 1.0 to 7.0:

Colombia
The most used grading systems are the numerical from 0 to 5 or from 0 to 10 and commonly are approved with 3 or 6, respectively. The letter system consists of E, S, B, A, I and is approved with A. The letter system is based on the numerical, meaning that the numerical system guides the letter one. While the universities only use the numerical system, with 3.0 being the passing grade, because it is more complex and students have more difficulty in approving a course. (Source: 1)

Numerical system from 0 to 5:

Numerical system from 0 to 10:

It is noteworthy that most schools no longer implement the grades below 1,0 as a null performance because is believed that it might cause low self-esteem in students.

Ecuador
In Ecuador, the rating system is 10 out of 10, including two decimal places in both primary, secondary and university, the highest score is 10 and the lowest is 0. The minimum grade required to pass a year is 7, depending on how schools are organized. Since 2012 it enjoys complete autonomy in Ecuador, so that some establishments maintain supplementary examination for those with less than 7, and other approved intensive recovery, but if the grade obtained is lower than 5, students are automatically disqualified and disciplinary actions are taken. If a student got 10 out of 10 in 90% of subjects in the first period, he is promoted to a senior year, after taking an entrance examination. Notes and academic qualifications and groups them reasoning thus:

 10–9.5 = Rated Excellent (A)
 9.4–9.0 = Rated Outstanding (B)
 8.9–8.0 = Very good credit rating (C)
 7.9–6.5 = Rating Sufficient or Good Sufficient (D)
 6.4–5.1 = Fail failing grade with Recovery option or supplementary examination (E)
 5.0–1.0 = Fail automatically (F)

This system is still applied to universities, the "Universidad de las Fuerzas Armadas (ESPE)" being the only exception, as they do not allow their students to take supplementary exams after every course.

Paraguay
The grades vary from 1 to 5, where 5 is the maximum grade achievable and 1 the lowest. The minimum for a pass is 2 (equivalent to 60%).

Peru
Grades range from 0 to 20, in an almost unique grading table. The passing grade is 11 in most schools and universities. In some preschool facilities, grades usually range from F to A+, following the American system, and in a few colleges, the passing grade is 10.

For most Peruvian universities the grading system is as follows:

Uruguay

In Uruguay, high grades are very hard to achieve. In  primary school, grades range in this order:

In secondary school, grades range from 1 to 12. 1 is the lowest and 12 is the highest. Passing an exam or course requires 6 out of 12 in high school or at a private university (although some subjects in secondary school require a grade of 7 or 8 to pass), and 3 out of 12 at a public university. In high school, a 6 corresponds to 50% on an exam or in a course while in a public university, a 3 corresponds to 60% in a course or exam. Grades of 10, 11, and 12 are considered excellent. Some private universities grade their students on a percentage basis, generally setting the passing benchmark between 60% and 70%.

Because of the acronym of the word "Sobresaliente" (Ste.), it is usually pronounced "Sote".

Venezuela
Grades in Venezuela may vary according to the education level, but normally the grading system is numerical, and ranges from 00 to 20, 00 being the lowest and 20 being the highest, and 10 being the pass mark, equivalent to a "D" in the United States. This system is not required, however, and several schools in Venezuela deviate from it by following a letter-grade system similar or identical to those in the United States. 

As of 2022, a new grading system in Venezuela has been implemented which compares to other Spanish-speaking countries. The new grading system now ranges from 00 to 10, 00 being the lowest and 10 being the highest.

Shown here is the Venezuelan grading system in probable comparison with the United States grading system:

References

Academic transfer
Education reform
Student assessment and evaluation
Educational evaluation methods